Marco Antonio Arana Zegarra (born in Cajamarca on October 20, 1962) is a Peruvian politician, sociologist, professor and former priest, founder and activist of the Tierra y Libertad Movement. He ran unsuccessfully for President in the 2021 elections, placing 16th.

Biography 
Marco Arana is the son of two teachers and the second of four siblings. His mother, Alcina Zegarra, a native of Pataz in La Libertad, was a teacher in a mining camp; and his father, César Arana, was born in Cajamarca where he worked as a teacher in the rural area.

He studied primary education at the Marist Brothers school in Cajamarca and secondary school at the Antonio Guillermo Urrelo Experimental School. From a very young age he participated in the Christian youth communities, developing social work activities.

In 1979, at the age of 17, he entered the San José de Cajamarca Major Seminary and, in turn, began his sociology studies at the National University of Cajamarca, specializing in the area of rural development. He also took philosophy courses.

In 1985, he arrived in Lima to continue his seminary studies and in 1989 he finished his theology studies at the Juan XXIII Superior Institute of Theological Studies. During this period he settled in the district of San Juan de Lurigancho and in 1990 he was finally ordained a diocesan priest.

In 1994, he had the opportunity to travel to Rome to study theology at the Pontifical Gregorian University, from which he graduated with honors.

He completed a master's degree in Sociology (1997-1998) specializing in Management and Public Policy at the Pontifical Catholic University of Peru thanks to a scholarship from the Belgian Interuniversity Council. His thesis was the first in Peru on socio-environmental conflicts, which allowed him to graduate with honors again.

The following year (1999) he followed a diploma on water and sanitation at the Faculty of Engineering of the National University of Cajamarca.

In 2002 he traveled to the United States to complement his academic training with a diploma in Social Management from the Inter-American Institute for Social Development in Washington.

Environmental activism 
In 1985, he was invited to the district of Hualgayoc, where Cajamarca's oldest mines operate, to make a documentary video about mining and its impact on agriculture, where he was able to appreciate the unhealthy conditions in which adults and children entered the mine, up to a thousand meters below sea level, without helmets or shoes.

Five years later and already ordained a priest, he developed a parish soup kitchen program in the community of Porcón. The activities were expanded to teach nutrition courses, childcare and deworming days. Later, with the help of the community, he managed to found the Cristo Ramos de Porcón School, which allows young people with limited resources to have access to a quality secondary education.

In 1993, with the help of the Episcopal Center for Social Action, he denounced the expropriation of peasant lands by the Newmont and Buenaventura mining company, whose North American officials finally accepted their responsibility and paid compensation to those affected.

In 1999, he formed EcoVida, the first ecological organization in Peru, together with young activists, biologists, sociologists and educators from the National University of Cajamarca. With this organization they carried out various initiatives, such as the "Campaign to save the San Lucas River" and the "Awareness raising on the burning of plastic."

Another of the initiatives that he developed was the creation of brigades of environmental educators, which had the support of the Franciscan Sisters and whose objective was to help the population in the formation of bio-gardens and in the installation of improved kitchens.

In 2002 he created the Training and Intervention Group for Sustainable Development (GRUFIDES) together with activists who focused on the problem of communities, human rights and ecological rights.

In 2003, with GRUFIDES, it carried out the Rural Roads to Fight Poverty project, which included six studies on roads in areas of extreme poverty, in addition to the project "Development of capacities for the resolution of environmental conflicts", with which they won a distinction from the Sierra y Democracia program.

At the beginning of 2011, Stephanie Boyd's documentary "Operation Diablo", in which Marco Arana participated, received the International Human Rights Film Award from the Berlin International Film Festival. It shows the difficult relationship with mining companies.

Political career

Tierra y Libertad movement 
In April 2009, he founded the Tierra y Libertad Movement, an environmentalist and leftist movement. In February 2010, he was suspended as a priest and decided to dedicate himself exclusively to his political candidacy with a view to the general elections of Peru in 2011. However, his party did not yet have its own electoral registration and seeks to promote a broad alliance of progressive parties and left with the social movements, of whose process he is proposed as a presidential candidate. However, his candidacy is not consolidated among the voters, so he temporarily withdraws from his candidacy.

After almost three years of collecting signatures, in April 2012 he managed to register the Tierra y Dignidad political party before the National Elections Jury, from which he promoted, together with other parties, the creation of a Broad Front of the left with a view to the 2016 electoral process. In October 2015, he presented himself in the primary elections of said party to be a candidate for the presidential elections of the following year, he would be in second place behind the Cusco congresswoman Verónika Mendoza. The ticket eventually place third, failing to qualify for the runoff.

Congressman 
In the 2016 general elections, the Broad Front became the first minority in parliament and Arana was elected Congressman. In these elections the alliance led by Verónika Mendoza obtains 20 representatives in the National Congress.

In July 2017, after a year of internal confrontations between the Arana and Mendoza factions, the Frente Amplio bench formalized its break. The group Nuevo Peru (supporters of Mendoza) indicates that "this is a way out in the face of wear and tear on the bench where there is no consensus and an adequate functioning with the participation of the 20 congressmen" and that they will not lose "one more minute in fights than they distract us from the problems of Peruvians » due to the discrepancies with the faction of Tierra y Libertad led by Marco Arana.

In an official letter sent by Nuevo Peru to Marco Arana, it reads: «The dialogue that you intend to initiate, after having excluded us more than two months ago from the decision-making of the parliamentary group, excluding from the meetings or failing to convene them, is a farce to which we are not going to lend ourselves.

The insurmountable nature of the political discrepancies between the sectors of Marco Arana and Veronika Mendoza were exposed in the first presidential vacancy process against Pedro Pablo Kuczynski, where the Broad Front, led by Marco Arana, voted en bloc in favor of the vacancy while that the congressmen of Nuevo Peru left the hemicycle seconds before the voting began. Marco Arana's position in this process was because “the vacancy is led by the president himself. (...) This president lied to his constituents, he hid his conflicts of interest from them ».

References 

1962 births
Candidates for President of Peru
Living people
Members of the Congress of the Republic of Peru
21st-century Peruvian politicians
Left-wing politics in Peru

People from Cajamarca Province
People from Cajamarca Region